Néant-sur-Yvel is a commune in the Morbihan department of Brittany in north-western France. The toponym refers to the river Yvel. Inhabitants of Néant-sur-Yvel are called in French Néantais.

See also
Communes of the Morbihan department

References

External links

 Mayors of Morbihan Association 

Communes of Morbihan